The 2004 Formula BMW UK season was the inaugural season of the British Formula BMW championship for young drivers making the transition to car racing. The series supported every BTCC round apart from round nine at Rockingham which supported the Days of Thunder championship. Tim Bridgman won the championship with his small family fun team after scoring in every round. Ayrton Senna's nephew Bruno Senna also took part in the championship towards the end of the season.

Teams and drivers
All cars were Mygale FB02 chassis powered by BMW engines. Guest drivers in italics.
All teams were British-registered.

Results and Standings

Calendar

 –Race was stopped due to a big accident involving Jordan Wise and Duarte Félix da Costa. Half points were awarded.

Drivers Championship

Sources
 tsl-timing.com
 https://www.driverdb.com/championships/standings/formula-bmw-uk/2004/ driverdb.com

Formula BMW seasons
Formula BMW
BMW UK